Sawt el Atlas is a French-Moroccan ten-piece band based in Paris. Their music combines many styles, including Arabic, raï, reggae, funk, and Latin rhythms. The group features two sets of three brothers (the Mirghani and El Habchi brothers) and is fronted by tenors Kamel el Habchi and Mounir Mirghani. The band first came together in the late 1980s in the city of Blois, when most of its members were teenagers or even younger. Soon they began touring through Europe, opening for the likes of Khaled, Cheb Mami, Youssou N'Dour, and Natacha Atlas. 1996 saw the release of their debut recording, Généraliser. Their sophomore effort, Donia, recorded equally in Paris and Cairo, was issued three years later. Love is the central topic of most of their songs, which feature lyrics in both Arabic and French.

Band members
Kamel El Habchi (vocals)
Mounir Mirghani (vocals)
Abdelkrim El Habchi (keyboards)
Adhil Mirghani (darbouki)
Khalid El Habchi (drums)
Samir Mirghani (congas, percussion)

Discography

Généraliser (1996, Rue Bleue)
 "Zmane" - 4:17
 "Ragga Raï" - 3:24
 "Bladi" - 5:17
 "Immigré" - 4:51
 "Amri" - 3:33
 "Nachtou" - 5:53
 "Généraliser" - 3:43
 "Arde Lille" - 4:40
 "Beida" - 4:42
 "Rabra Bina - 4:37
 "Sbabi" - 3:51

Donia (2001, Tinder Records)
"Ne Me Jugez Pas [Don't Judge Me]" - 3:30
"Ya Mra [Oh Lady]" - 3:55
"Donia [Life]" - 3:38
"Ness [People]" - 3:34
"Le Soleil de Ma Vie [The Sunshine of My Life]" - 4:07
"L'Hagra [Abandoned]" - 3:55
"Andalucía [Andalusia]" - 4:25
"Mama [Mother]" - 4:23
"Zmane y Dore [The Wheel Turns]" - 4:58
"Datna [Our Life Led Us]" - 3:48
"Mouminine [The Faithful, The Believer]" - 4:05
"Ne Me Jugez Pas [Arabic Version]" - 3:38

Contributed to:
 Natacha Atlas Halim (1997, Nation Records) [ "Amulet" ]

Compilations:
 Africa - Tea In Marrakech ["Zmane y Dore (Times Change)"]
 Arabic Groove (Putumayo Presents) ["Ne Me Jugez Pas (Volodia Remix)"]
 Mega Rai V.2 (4 cd) ("Bladi")
 Spirit of Rai ("Zmane")	
 World, Vol. 1 ["Ne Me Jugez Pas (Si Je l'Aime Autant)"]

French reggae musical groups